Mathilda Fredrika Gelhaar (née Ficker; 3 September 1814 in Stockholm –  24 April 1889) was a Swedish opera singer. She was also appointed official singer of the royal court. 

Mathilda Gelhaar was the daughter of Christian Fredrik Ficker, a musician at the Kungliga Hovkapellet, and Johanna Charlotta Widerberg. She was the sister of the actress Charlotta Almlöf, granddaughter of the actor Andreas Widerberg and niece of the opera primadonna Henriette Widerberg. 
In 1836, she married Fredrik Gelhaar, musician at Kungliga Hovkapellet.  She was the mother of the opera singer Wilhelmina Gelhaar.

She was enrolled as a student in Dramatens elevskola with her sister in 1828, where Mathilda was trained as a singer and Charlotta as an actor.  She made her debut at the Royal Swedish Opera in 1829, and was engaged at the royal opera in 1834-58.

Mathilda Gelhaar was referred to as one of the most noted singers of the Swedish Opera, particularly in the 1840s and 1850s.  She was described as a skillful coloratura soprano.   One of her most famed performances was a duet with Jenny Lind. She retired in 1858.

Mathilda Gelhaar was made Hovsångare in 1837.

References 

 	Anteckningar om svenska qvinnor, 1864 
 Österberg, Carin et al., Svenska kvinnor: föregångare, nyskapare. Lund: Signum 1990.
 Sohlmans musiklexikon, andra bandet, 1950
 Nordisk familjebok / 1800-talsutgåvan. 5. Folkvisor - Grimnesmål

1814 births
1889 deaths
19th-century Swedish women opera singers
Swedish operatic sopranos